"Kids these days" is the belief that the present generation of young people is inferior or deficient compared to previous generations. A study by John Protzko and Jonathan W. Schooler has found that such beliefs have been reported since 624 BCE. This term has been described as being ageist and adultist.

References

Further reading

Youth
Age-related stereotypes